The Round Barn (Gilmore Barn) is a historic octagonal barn located near Ash Grove, Greene County, Missouri. The Round barn now serves the community as a unique event venue http://www.theroundbarnmo.com/. It was built circa 1899, and is a three-story limestone bank barn, 70 feet in diameter, with interior post and beam framing.  The roof is in cone sections topped by an octagonal cupola.

It was listed on the National Register of Historic Places in 1994.

References

Octagon barns in the United States
Barns on the National Register of Historic Places in Missouri
Buildings and structures completed in 1899
Buildings and structures in Greene County, Missouri
National Register of Historic Places in Greene County, Missouri